Fallen Art (Polish Sztuka spadania, lit. The Art of Falling) is a six-minute, animated short film written and directed by Tomasz Bagiński. It features Romanian band Fanfare Ciocărlia's song "Asfalt Tango." The film was produced and created by Platige Image, a VFX company. Fallen Art received the Jury Honors at the SIGGRAPH 2005 Computer Animation Festival, and in 2006, it received the British Academy of Film and Television Arts Award.

Plot 
Fallen Art presents the story of General AI, a self-proclaimed artist. His art, however, consists of a deranged method of stop motion photography, where the individual frames of the movie are created by photographs made by Dr. Johann Friedrich, depicting the bodies of dead soldiers, pushed down by Sergeant Al from a giant springboard onto a slab of concrete.

References

External links 
 Fallen Art - Platige Shorts
 
 
CGSociety Interview

2004 animated films
2004 films
2000s animated short films
BAFTA winners (films)
Polish animated short films